Darbid Haft Cheshmeh may refer to:

Darbid Haft Cheshmeh-e Olya
Darbid Haft Cheshmeh-e Sofla